Bidabad may refer to:
 Bidabad, Isfahan
 Bidabad, Khuzestan